At the Gates of Moscow 1941 is a 1985 video game published by Strategic Games Publications for the Apple II, based on the board game of the same name.

Gameplay
At the Gates of Moscow 1941 is a game in which the battle between Germany and Russia from summer 1941 is simulated.

Reception
Lew Fisher reviewed the game for Computer Gaming World, and stated that "ATGOM is an excellent effort for the designer's first computer game."

References

1985 video games
Apple II games
Apple II-only games
Computer wargames
Multiplayer and single-player video games
Turn-based strategy video games
Video games about Nazi Germany
Video games based on board games
Video games developed in the United States
Video games set in Moscow
Video games set in the Soviet Union
World War II video games